Zbigniew Stanisław Miązek (born January 9, 1966 in Drzewica) is a Polish slalom canoer who competed from the late 1980s to the mid-1990s. He finished 15th in the C-1 event at the 1992 Summer Olympics in Barcelona.

References
 Sports-reference.com profile

1966 births
Canoeists at the 1992 Summer Olympics
Living people
Olympic canoeists of Poland
Polish male canoeists
People from Opoczno County
Sportspeople from Łódź Voivodeship